The Book of Heroic Failures, written by Stephen Pile in 1979, is a book written in celebration of human inadequacy in all its forms. Entries include William McGonagall, a notoriously bad poet, and Teruo Nakamura, a soldier of the Imperial Japanese Army who fought for Japan in World War II until 1974.

The original edition included an application to become a member of the Not Terribly Good Club of Great Britain; however, this was taken out in later editions because the club received over 20,000 applications and closed in 1979 on the grounds that, "Even as failures, we failed" (but not before Pile himself had been expelled from it for publishing a bestseller). The American version of the book was misprinted by the publishers, who left out half the introduction. As a consequence, later versions of the book came out with an erratum slip longer than the entire introduction. In his second book The Return of Heroic Failures, published in 1988, Stephen Pile reports that Taiwanese pirates were not aware of this and did not include the erratum slip. The second book was published in the USA under the title Cannibals in the Cafeteria.

The second book came out in Greece in 1992 although the first one had never been published there.  In fact, this second book was named "Η ΤΕΧΝΗ ΤΗΣ ΑΠΟΤΥΧΙΑΣ No1" (The Art of Failure No. 1).  A small erratum slip in the book itself explains that it was a mistake. In an interview with English Radio DJ Andrew Marshall, Pile said, "The Book is one of the least successful books ever issued in the USA, I don't think it has reached double figures there as yet and long may that remain the case."

In 1999 Penguin made the decision to re-publish the book as part of their "Penguin Readers" series to encourage reading from a young age.

A third volume, The Ultimate Book of Heroic Failures, was published by Faber and Faber in 2011, and a selection from the first two volumes (the author's last ever word on the subject of heroic failure) was published in 2012.

Notable failures by chapter 

The World of Work
 Daniel Price (priest)
 Tommy Cooper
 Francis Webb (engineer)
 William Stern (businessman)
 MV Argo Merchant
 Mariner 1
 Edsel
 Caproni Ca.90

Off Duty
 English as She Is Spoke
 Arthur Paul Pedrick
 Robert South
 Jude the Apostle
 George Plimpton

Law and Order
 James Berry (executioner)
 Joseph Samuel

Playing the Game
 Thomas Birch
 Maurice Flitcroft
 The Boat Race 1912
 Rafael Gómez Ortega
 Beltrán Alfonso Osorio, 18th Duke of Alburquerque
 Horatio Bottomley

The Cultural Side of Things
 Florence Foster Jenkins
 Portsmouth Sinfonia
 William McGonagall
 Julia A. Moore
 George Wither
 Margaret Cavendish, Duchess of Newcastle-upon-Tyne
 Wicked Bible
 World Government Party
 John Warburton (officer of arms) 
 Person from Porlock
 Le Bateau
 Robert Coates (actor)

War and Peace
 Ambrose Burnside
 Antonio López de Santa Anna
 Anglo-Zanzibar War
 Hiroo Onoda
 Teruo Nakamura
 HMS Trinidad (46)
 Mitrailleuse
 Sticky bomb
 Lunge mine
 Anti-tank dog
 USS Swordfish (SSN-579)

The Business of Politics
 Charles D. B. King
 Assassination attempts on Fidel Castro

Love and Marriage
 Augustus II the Strong

The Art of Being Wrong
 Dionysius Lardner
 The Beatles' Decca audition
 John Sedgwick

Books 
 
  Published in the USA as 
 
 , a selection from the first two volumes.

References 

1979 non-fiction books
British non-fiction books
Failure